The Welsh Greyhound Derby was a former classic greyhound competition held in Wales.

It was held at the White City Stadium in Cardiff from 1928 to 1937. After the closure of this stadium the race switched to the Cardiff Arms Park from 1945 until 1977. It gained classic status in 1971.

When the Cardiff Arms Park closed to greyhound racing there was no remaining fully licensed National Greyhound Racing Club track in Wales resulting in the race discontinuing. During the vast majority of its existence the race formed part of the triple crown of racing alongside the English Greyhound Derby and Scottish Greyhound Derby.

The famous Mick the Miller, who was a household name during the 1930s won the event in 1930.

Past winners

Discontinued

Venues
1928–1937 (Welsh White City, Cardiff 525 yards)
1945–1974 (Arms Park, Cardiff 525 yards)
1975–1977 (Arms Park, Cardiff 500 metres)

References

Greyhound racing competitions in the United Kingdom
Greyhound racing in Wales
Sports competitions in Cardiff
Recurring sporting events established in 1928
Recurring sporting events disestablished in 1977
1928 establishments in Wales
1977 disestablishments in Wales